Mohamed Ihsan Attia Massoud (محمد احسان, born ) is an Egyptian male weightlifter, competing in the +105 kg category and representing Egypt at international competitions. He competed at world championships, including at the 2015 World Weightlifting Championships.  He participated at the 2004 Summer Olympics in the +105 kg event. He won the gold medal at the 2011 Summer Universiade, but was disqualified for using the forbidden substance methylhexanamine.

Major results

References

External links
 

1984 births
Living people
Egyptian male weightlifters
Weightlifters at the 2004 Summer Olympics
Olympic weightlifters of Egypt
Place of birth missing (living people)
World Weightlifting Championships medalists
Doping cases in weightlifting
Egyptian sportspeople in doping cases
African Games gold medalists for Egypt
African Games medalists in weightlifting
Competitors at the 2015 African Games
21st-century Egyptian people